In the United States, the far-right Great Replacement conspiracy theory holds that political elites are purposefully seeking to increase the number of racial minorities to displace the white American population. Supporters have used the conspiracy theory as a populist (and often racist) canard to advocate anti-immigration policies, and to discredit politicians who they perceive as left-wing. The theory has generated strong support in many sectors of the Republican Party of the United States and has become a major issue of political debate. It also has stimulated violent reactionary responses, including mass murders. The name is derived from the "Great Replacement" theory, invented in 2011 by French author Renaud Camus and promoted in Europe, and also has similarities to the white genocide conspiracy theory, popularized by American neo-Nazi David Lane in his 1995 White Genocide Manifesto.

Similar views have their origins in American nativism around 1900. According to Erika Lee, in 1894 the old stock Yankee upper-class founders of the Immigration Restriction League were "convinced that Anglo-Saxon traditions, peoples, and culture were being drowned in a flood of racially inferior foreigners from Southern and Eastern Europe." The modern movement in favor of this conspiracy theory expanded with Gamergate in 2014, and has received significant attention following the 2017 Unite the Right rally.

Responding to demographic projections 

Changes in the method by which the Census Bureau classifies the population by race led to a 2008 projection that white non-hispanic Americans will make up less than half the population of the U.S. by 2042. This projection was criticized by academics as misleading, but was widely publicized by national media and white nationalist groups.  Sociologist Richard Alba states, "The population projections that undergird the widespread belief in the arrival of a majority-minority society in the next few decades are based on the classification of the great majority of mixed majority-minority individuals as 'not white,' and hence as 'minority.' The evidence so far strongly contradicts this classification."  Nevertheless, the projection generated widespread anxiety and even violence.  It was a matter of how to read statistics. As the New York Times reported, a study co-authored by demographer Dowell Myers, "found that presenting the data differently could produce a much less anxious reaction.... [T]hey found that the negative effects that came from reading about a white decline were largely erased when the same people read about how the white category was in fact getting bigger by absorbing multiracial young people through intermarriage."

According to Kaleigh Rogers of FiveThirtyEight, arguments for a "great replacement" in the United States are "built on false assumptions about American demographics and immigration: that white people will soon be a minority in this country, that immigrants and non-white voters are all Democrats, and that no longer being the majority group means a loss of power. When those assumptions are torn down, the true justifications for these fears become transparent."

A May 2022 poll by the Associated Press found that one-third of American adults believed that an effort was underway "to replace native-born Americans with immigrants for electoral gains". The poll found that those who reported themselves as viewers of conservative and far-right media outlets were more likely to believe the theory, with 45% of One America News Network (OANN) and Newsmax viewers and 31% of Fox News viewers believing in it, as compared to 13% of CNN viewers and 11% of MSNBC viewers.

Another May 2022 poll by Yahoo! News and YouGov found that 61% of people who voted for Donald Trump in the 2020 U.S. presidential election believe that "a group of people in this country are trying to replace native-born Americans with immigrants and people of color who share their political views."

History 

The origins of the basic idea of the replacement of the white population in the United States date to the late 19th century, when upper class Americans began to fear the arrival of what they considered inferior Catholic and Jewish immigrants from Eastern and Southern Europe. Leaders included Republican Senator Henry Cabot Lodge and polemicist Madison Grant, author of The Passing of the Great Race (1916). They sought immigration restriction. It was finally imposed by Congress in the Immigration Act of 1924. However the main restrictions were removed by the Immigration and Nationality Act of 1965.
 
According to Elle Reeve of CNN, the great replacement "stayed mostly on the margins [in the United States] until 2014". That year, members of Gamergate began "mingl[ing] with neo-Nazis" on 4chan and 8chan, resulting in a "massive wave of young people enter[ing] what had been an old man's world of White nationalism."

In 2017, white supremacist protesters at the Unite the Right rally in Charlottesville, Virginia used slogans that alluded to similar ideas of ethnic replacement, such as "You will not replace us" and "Jews will not replace us". After that event, Renaud Camus, the French writer who coined the term  "Great Replacement," stated that he did not support violence, and disputed any association between his ideas and neo-Nazis; however, he said he approved of the feeling behind the chant. U.S. representative Steve King endorsed the conspiracy theory, stating: "Great replacement, yes," referring to the European migrant crisis that "these people walking into Europe by ethnic migration, 80 percent are young men." King presents the Great Replacement as a shared concern of Europe and the United States, claiming that "if we continue to abort our babies and import a replacement for them in the form of young violent men, we are supplanting our culture, our civilization." He has blamed George Soros as an alleged perpetrator behind the conspiracy.

In May 2019, Florida State Senator Dennis Baxley was reported to use the replacement theory in relation to the abortion debate in the United States. Speaking of Western European birthrates as a warning to Americans, he said: "When you get a birth rate less than 2 percent, that society is disappearing, and it's being replaced by folks that come behind them and immigrate, don't wish to assimilate into that society and they do believe in having children." The following month, Nick Isgro, Vice Chair of the Maine Republican Party endorsed the conspiracy theory after claiming financial subsidies were promoted for abortions in the U.S. to "kill our own people", and that asylum seekers were "human pawns who are being played in a game by global elites and their partners here in Augusta." Greg Kesich, a writer for the Portland Press Herald, reported that the current Mayor of Waterville's speech displayed the sentiment of the Great Replacement.

In August 2019, a far right terrorist killed 23 people at a Walmart in El Paso, Texas, in the deadliest attack on Latinos in modern American history. Before the massacre, he released an anti-Hispanic, anti-immigrant manifesto promoting the Great Replacement.  While the document uses language about immigrants similar to that used by U.S. president Donald Trump,"[S]ome of the language included in the document parroted Trump's own words, characterizing Hispanic migrants as invaders taking American jobs and arguing to 'send them back'." "Portions of the 2,300-word essay, titled 'The Inconvenient Truth', closely mirror Trump's rhetoric, as well as the language of the white nationalist movement, including a warning about the 'Hispanic invasion of Texas'."

In July 2019, Keith Ellison, the Attorney General of Minnesota, stated how increasing and varied hate crime, exacerbated by the 2016 Brexit vote and election of Donald Trump, was "united by so-called 'replacement' theory, and that communities needed to "vigilantly and consistently counter each of these acts of violence and expressions of hate". At the same time, Mick Davis, the Chief Executive and Treasurer of the British Conservative Party, published his outrage of the concept. Writing in The Jewish Chronicle, Davis named the Great Replacement, "a driving force behind far right terror", as worse than merely a conspiracy theory, in that it was "profoundly antisemitic".

According to the Institute for Strategic Dialogue, president Trump has referenced the Great Replacement, and a 2019 tweet in favour of his proposed Border Wall was interpreted by many as endorsing the theory. They also stated that Trump's Twitter account was one of the most influential accounts promoting the theory. His history of describing Muslims and migrants as "invaders", according to SBS News, closely mirrors the language of explicit supporters of the theory. Political scientist Robert A. Pape concluded from two surveys led by the Chicago Project on Security and Threats in 2021 that the Great Replacement theory had achieved "iconic status with white nationalists" and "might help explain why such a high percentage of the rioters [involved in the January 6 United States Capitol attack] hail[ed] from counties with fast-rising, non-White populations."

In April 2021, the conspiracy theory was prominently and repeatedly mentioned by conservative television host Tucker Carlson on the Tucker Carlson Tonight show. Days later, during a committee hearing, Republican Congressman Scott Perry said "For many Americans, what seems to be happening or what they believe right now is happening is, what appears to them is we're replacing national-born Americans, native-born Americans to permanently transform the landscape of this very nation." Former speaker Newt Gingrich echoed the theory's sentiments while discussing immigration in a Fox News interview in August 2021, accusing the "anti-American left" of aiming to "drown traditional classic Americans" with mass immigration. On 22 September 2021, Tucker Carlson promoted the conspiracy theory on a segment of his Fox News show Tucker Carlson Tonight, claiming that President Joe Biden was intentionally trying to replace the population with people from the third world. According to a New York Times analysis published in April 2022, Carlson has made reference to the theory in more than 400 episodes between 2016 and 2021.

One day after the 2022 Buffalo shooting, avowed Christian nationalist Andrew Torba, a proponent of far-right accelerationism and the CEO of alt-tech platform Gab, said that "The best way to stop White genocide and White replacement, both of which are demonstrably and undeniably happening, is to get married to a White woman and have a lot of White babies". Following the mass shooting in Buffalo, U.S. Representative for New York Elise Stefanik, the third-highest ranking Republican official in the House of Representatives, faced scrutiny for past campaign ads that traffic in language similar to that used by Great Replacement conspiracy theorists. In one attack ad, she falsely accused "radical Democrats" of planning to permanently undermine elections by "grant[ing] amnesty to 11 million illegal immigrants [who] will overthrow our current electorate and create a permanent liberal majority in Washington". During the 2022 United States infant formula shortage, Stefanik accused President Biden of withholding formula from American mothers while providing it to undocumented immigrants. In response to criticism following the shooting, she refused to repudiate replacement theory, and defended using language reminiscent of QAnon conspiracy theory tropes aimed at the LGBTQ community.

See also 
 Angry white male
 Christian nationalism
 Demographic threat
 Disappearing blonde gene hoax
 Nativism in United States politics
 Racial views of Donald Trump
 Replacement migration
 The Camp of the Saints

References

Further reading 
 Alba, Richard. The Great Demographic Illusion: Majority, Minority, and the Expanding American Mainstream (Princeton UP, 2020)  https://doi.org/10.1515/9780691202112 
 Alba, Richard, and Christopher Maggio. "Demographic change and assimilation in the early 21st-century United States." Proceedings of the National Academy of Sciences 119.13 (2022): e2118678119 online.
 Alexander, Charles C. "Prophet of American Racism: Madison Grant and the Nordic Myth" Phylon 23#1 pp 73–90 online.
 
 Daniel, Reginald. "Sociology of Multiracial Identity in the Late 1980s and Early 1990s: The Failure of a Perspective." Journal of Ethnic and Cultural Studies 8.2 (2021): 106–125. online
 Lee, Erika. "America first, immigrants last: American xenophobia then and now." Journal of the Gilded Age and Progressive Era 19.1 (2020): 3–18. online
 Lee, Erika. America for Americans: A History of Xenophobia in the United States (2019). excerpt
 Leslie, Gregory John, and David O. Sears. "The Heaviest Drop of Blood: Black Exceptionalism Among Multiracials." Political Psychology (2022). online
 Rodríguez-Muñiz, Michael. Figures of the future: Latino civil rights and the politics of demographic change (Princeton University Press, 2021).
 Song, Miri. "Who counts as multiracial?." Ethnic and Racial Studies 44.8 (2021): 1296–1323.
 Stefaniak, Anna, and Michael JA Wohl. "In time, we will simply disappear: Racial demographic shift undermines privileged group members’ support for marginalized social groups via collective angst." Group Processes & Intergroup Relations 25.3 (2022): NP1-NP23. online

Alt-right
White genocide conspiracy theory
Anti-immigration politics in the United States
Conspiracy theories involving race and ethnicity
Cultural assimilation
White supremacy in the United States
Conspiracy theories promoted by Donald Trump
Demography